is the fifth studio album by Japanese singer-songwriter Miyuki Nakajima, released in March 1979.

The album is best known for the track "Ōkami ni Naritai", which has been one of fan favorites and later included on the compilation album Daiginjo released in 1996. It gained another public attention in the late 1990s, through the TV ad for Otsuka Pharmaceutical Co.'s energy drink which features the song.

Shin-ai Naru Mono e was relatively successful upon its release, although there was no lead single before the album came out. It debuted at the number-three on the Oricon LP chart and climbed the summit of there in April 1979, providing her with the first number-one spot on the album chart.

Track listing
All songs written and composed by Miyuki Nakajima

Side one
All tracks arranged by Takahiko Ishikawa (except "Taxi Driver" and "Neyuki" arranged by Shun Fukui)
"" - 4:38
"" - 6:09
"" - 3:01
"" - 3:08
"" - 6:23

Side two
All tracks arranged by Shun Fukui (except "Koishi no You ni" and "Ōkami ni Naritai" arranged by Takahiko Ishikawa)
"" - 2:34
"" - 4:25
"" - 3:36
"" - 5:42
"" - 6:48

Personnel
Miyuki Nakajima - Lead vocal, acoustic guitar
Takahiko Ishikawa - Acoustic guitar, banjo
Kiyoshi Sugimoto - Acoustic guitar
Shigeru Suzuki - Electric guitar
Ken Yajima - Electric guitar
Graham Thumb Picking Power - Electric bass
Hiro Tsunoda - Drums
Tatsuo Hayashi - Drums
Nobu Saito - Percussion
Pecker - Percussion
Jake H. Conception - Saxophone
Shunzo Sunahara - Flute
Makiko Tashiro - Keyboards
Kentaro Haneda - Keyboards

Production
Recording director: Yoshio Okujima
Recording and mixing engineer: Yoshihiko Kaminari
Remixing and  mixing engineer: Kinji Yoshino
Assistant engineer: Kouji Sakakibara
Promoter: Yoshiki Ishikawa
Manager: Hiroshi Kojima
Assistant promotional manager: Kunio Kaneko
Designer: Hirofumi Arai
Art director: Jin Tamura
Costume designer: Mihoko Kiyokawa
Producer: Miyuki Nakajima
General producer: Genichi Kawakami
Recorded at Epicurus and Take One Studios, special thanks to Kochibi

Chart positions

Release history

References

Miyuki Nakajima albums
1979 albums
Pony Canyon albums